The black-barred danio (Danio absconditus) is a species of Danio discovered in Myanmar by Tin Win in 2005 and described in 2015 by Sven Oscar Kullander and Ralf Britz.

References

Danio
Fish described in 2015
Taxa named by Sven O. Kullander
Taxa named by Ralf Britz